The Road of Ambition is a 1920 American silent drama film directed by William P.S. Earle and starring Conway Tearle, Florence Dixon and Gladden James.

Cast
 Conway Tearle as Bill Matthews
 Florence Dixon as Daphne Van Steer
 Gladden James as Philip Colt
 Florence Billings as May Larrabee
 Arthur Housman as Monty Newcomb
 Tom Brooke as Mr. Benson 
 Tom McGuire as Old Mack 
 Adolph Milar as Ole Olson

References

Bibliography
 George A. Katchmer. Eighty Silent Film Stars: Biographies and Filmographies of the Obscure to the Well Known. McFarland, 1991.

External links
 

1920 films
1920 drama films
1920s English-language films
American silent feature films
Silent American drama films
American black-and-white films
Films directed by William P. S. Earle
Selznick Pictures films
1920s American films
English-language drama films